Gary Kirsten (born 23 November 1967) is a South African cricket coach and former cricketer. He has coached the Indian Cricket Team as well as the South African Cricket team.

Kirsten played 101 Test matches and 185 One Day Internationals for South Africa between 1993 and 2004, mainly as an opening batsman. His half brother Peter also played provincial cricket for Western Province, and then later for the South Africa cricket team which included the highlight of the 1992 Cricket World Cup.

Kirsten was the coach of the Indian cricket team from 2008 to 2011, going on to win the 2011 Cricket World Cup. He was appointed as the coach of the South African cricket team in June 2011, and he stepped down in August 2013.

Playing career

Kirsten made his Test debut against Australia in Melbourne in 1993. He retired from international cricket in 2004 after crafting a match-winning 76 in his final innings, against New Zealand. Against the same country, he had made history by becoming the first-ever Protea to play in 100 Test matches.

Over the years, Kirsten gained a reputation as being a sturdy batsman in both Test cricket and One Day cricket. He could up the tempo of an innings if he needed to, but more often than not he simply waited for the bad ball in test cricket. He was also a reliable fielder. Kirsten held the South African records for most runs and centuries in a Test career, before both were surpassed by Jacques Kallis. He was the first Test batsman to make hundreds against each of the other 9 Test nations. He scored 275 runs against England as a result of batting for over 14 and a half hours as South Africa followed on at Kingsmead in Durban, it still stands as the second-longest innings (in terms of duration) in Test history.

The high score was later surpassed by Graeme Smith when he made 277 against England in 2003. He still holds the record for highest innings by a South African in a One Day International; 188 not-out made against the United Arab Emirates during the 1996 World Cup, which is the tenth highest innings of all time in One Day International cricket, and the third-highest score in World Cup cricket history. This record stood until it was surpassed by Chris Gayle who scored 215 against Zimbabwe in 2015. Later, that record was surpassed by Martin Guptill who scored 237* against the West Indies in the quarter-finals of that very World Cup.

Coaching career

India (2008–2011)
After retirement, Kirsten organized his own cricket academy. In November 2007, it emerged that Kirsten was a candidate for the vacant post of coach of the India team. The BCCI offered him a two-year contract for the post, and despite voicing reservations about concerns he had about having the full support of the Indian players, he confirmed he would be taking the job on 4 December.

Kirsten officially started as a coach on 1 March 2008. However, he travelled to Australia with India beforehand during the test series. His first full series in charge was against his home country, South Africa in March–April 2008 which was drawn 1–1. Also, he coached India to the finals of the Kitply Cup and 2008 Asia Cup (India lost both the finals). During his tenure as Coach of India, the Indian cricket team won a home series against Australia beating them 2–0. Apart from clinching the Border-Gavaskar trophy, he also coached India to its first bilateral series win in Sri Lanka against Sri Lanka and India's first Test and One-Day International series victories against New Zealand in New Zealand after 40 years. India also won the Compaq Cup, defeating Sri Lanka in the finals on 14 September 2009 by 46 runs. A highly accomplished batsman himself, he has brought in a considerable amount of improvement in the batting performances, which is largely associated with his ability to instill better confidence among younger players.

Kirsten has been praised by all players for improving/enhancing their playing techniques, motivating them and discussing tactics that can be deployed on the field. The results could be clearly seen within months. He is considered the key force behind the clearly visible performance improvement in all players. In 2010, Prior to the start of India's tour of South Africa, Indian captain M.S. Dhoni described him as "The best thing to happen to Indian cricket."

In 2017, Kirsten spoke to HBR about the qualities of a great coach, coaching a young team, and learning from one's mistakes. Some edited excerpts of his interview are online.

World Cup 2011 
After the tour of South Africa, which India drew 1–1 in the Test series lost 3–2 in ODIs, Kirsten announced he would not renew his contract with BCCI because of family commitments. Kirsten often stated that he wanted to spend time with his two growing sons, Joshua and James, and his wife. He has also stated that he felt three years away from home was long enough. Immediately after the announcement Kirsten was linked with joining South Africa as their coach as the South Africa coach Corrie van Zyl also announced his contract would end after the World Cup as well.

Kirsten ended his tenure as coach after India won the 2011 Cricket World Cup defeating Sri Lanka by 6 wickets and 10 balls to spare on 2 April 2011 at Wankhede Stadium in Mumbai, India. During the celebration, he was carried around the ground by Suresh Raina, Yusuf Pathan and Virat Kohli to show their respect.

Kirsten cleared the air of any rumours about a renewal in contract by adopting a modest approach on his further availability as a coach to the Indian team by stating that he wanted to say goodbye to India to spend time with his family.

South Africa (2011–2013)
On 5 June 2011, Kirsten was appointed the full-time coach of the South Africa national cricket team for a term period of two years. His first decision was to name AB de Villiers as the new captain for the limited-overs game, replacing Graeme Smith who remained the Test side captain. Kirsten began his term as a coach on 1 August and his first assignment was a home series against Australia. He took over from Corrie van Zyl, who was an interim coach for 14 months after Mickey Arthur resigned following the home series against England in 2009–10. Under Kirsten, in August 2012, the South African team reached number 1 in the ICC Test rankings, by defeating England 2–0.

Kirsten did not renew his contract with Cricket South Africa (CSA) and stepped down as the coach of the national team in August 2013 citing family commitments.

Hobart Hurricanes (2017–2018) 
On 3 April 2017, Kirsten was appointed head coach of the men's Hobart Hurricanes cricket team. The Hobart Hurricanes are Tasmania's professional T20 cricket club in the Australian Big Bash League.

Royal Challengers Bangalore (2017–2019) 
In January 2018, Royal Challengers Bangalore appointed Kirsten as their batting coach. In August 2018, he was appointed as head coach of RCB following the sacking of their previous coach Daniel Vettori for the 2019 Indian Premier League .

Gujarat Titans (2022–present) 
Following former head coach Dean Jones' death in September 2020, reports began to spread in December 2020 that Kirsten was appointed as the new head coach of the Karachi Kings. This was later revealed to be untrue, with Kirsten only being considered for the job, and it ultimately being given to former South African cricketer Herschelle Gibbs. In January 2021, reports came in that the Pakistan Cricket Board was planning to fire current head coach Misbah-Ul-Haq. This came following the team's poor results against New Zealand in the World Test Championship. Kirsten is reported to be a favourite for the job, along with former Zimbabwean player Andy Flower.

In January 2022, Kirsten was appointed batting coach and mentor of newly formed Gujarat Titans.

Following the dismissal of Chris Silverwood due to  the England Cricket Team's 4-0 defeat in the 2021-22 Ashes series, Kirsten emerged as a favourite for the role of Men's Test Head Coach having previously been linked with the England Cricket Team prior to Silverwood's appointment in 2019. The role was instead given to Brendon McCullum.

Business interests
In 2007, Kirsten joined Paddy Upton and Dale Williams to form a company called Performance Zone. The focus of the company is to work with individuals and teams in business and sport, bringing out their clients' best performance. When Kirsten was appointed Indian coach and Upton as Indian mental conditioning coach on a two-year contract, they decided to continue the business. Its first project post Kirsten taking on the Indian coach role has been the creation of garykirsten.com.

References

South Africa One Day International cricketers
South Africa Test cricketers
Western Province cricketers
Wisden Cricketers of the Year
South Africa Test cricket captains
1967 births
Living people
Coaches of the Indian national cricket team
Coaches of the South Africa national cricket team
Sportspeople from Cape Town
Alumni of Rondebosch Boys' High School
Cricketers at the 1996 Cricket World Cup
Cricketers at the 1999 Cricket World Cup
Cricketers at the 2003 Cricket World Cup
Indian Premier League coaches
South African cricket coaches